The seventh season of the Canadian television comedy series Video on Trial premiered on MuchMusic on September 19, 2011 and concluded on December 9, 2012. It consists of 42 episodes.

Background
Video on Trial features music videos being humorously critiqued in a manner akin to a courtroom trial. The show's tongue-in-cheek manifesto, as announced in its original opening sequence, is seeing to it that "all music videos are brought to justice". A typical half-hour episode features five music videos being "tried" by a panel of five personalities acting as jurors.

The seventh season of Video on Trial retains the abridged episode format introduced midway through the fifth season. A new graphical scheme for the series was introduced in episode 19.

Episodes

References

2011 Canadian television seasons
2012 Canadian television seasons